Sainte-Geneviève-des-Ardents, known as Sainte-Geneviève-la-Petite in the Middle Ages, was a church located at present-day Parvis Notre-Dame – Place Jean-Paul-II in the Île de la Cité in Paris, France. It is dedicated to Saint Genevieve, the miracles imputed to whom included "the cessation of a horrible plague, called the mal ardent, which desolated Paris in the reign of Louis le Gros".

History
A Sainte-Geneviève chapel, under the authority of the abbey of the same name, was attested in the 9th century. It was mentioned as a proper parish from 1128, which makes it the oldest attested parish of La Cité quarter.

The church was re-built in the 15th, in part thanks to the donations of bookseller Nicolas Flamel. Flamel was represented in a niche next to the portal. Theologian and casuist  became the vicar of the church in 1666.

The Sainte-Geneviève and Saint-Christophe parishes, both situated at present-day Parvis Notre-Dame – Place Jean-Paul-II, were suppressed in 1747 and merged with the parish of Sainte-Madeleine. The church of Sainte-Geneviève-des-Ardents was destroyed in January 1747 to enable the extension works of the Hôpital des Enfants-Trouvés. The walls of the church were excavated when the archaeological crypt was built. Now, the outline of the former building is shown by a lighter tiling on Parvis Notre-Dame.

References

Roman Catholic churches in the 4th arrondissement of Paris
Former Roman Catholic church buildings
Destroyed churches in France
Former buildings and structures in Paris
Île de la Cité
Buildings and structures demolished in 1747
1747 disestablishments in Europe